Proborhyaena is an extinct genus of proborhyaenid sparassodont that lived during the Oligocene of what is now South America. It is considered to be the largest of the sparassodonts.

Description
This animal was very large in size, with the skull alone reaching up to 40 centimeters long, and the whole animal may have been as large as a present-day grizzly bear. It was a massive animal, with a robust and powerful body. Its skull was equipped with a short, high snout, and its caniniform teeth were saber-shaped, although not as developed as those of the later Thylacosmilus. The canines, in contrast to those of Thylacosmilus which had an "almond-shaped" section and a sharp margin, were ovoid in cross-section and thus must have been much more robust. Like the thylacosmilids, Proborhyaena possessed only one pair of lower incisors.

Classification
Proborhyaena was first described by Florentino Ameghino in 1897, based on fossils found in Patagonia in deposits dating to the Late Oligocene (Deseadan). Subsequently, more fossils ascribed to this species were found from the Salla Formation of Bolivia, and the Fray Bentos Formation of Uruguay, which suggests a wide distribution and success of this sparassodont. In addition, fossils assigned to Proborhyaena have been found in the Agua de la Piedra Formation of Mendoza Province, Argentina.

Proborhyaena is the eponymous genus of the family Proborhyaenidae, also including smaller forms such as Callistoe and Arminiheringia these animals belonged to the sparassodonts, a group of metatherian mammals akin to marsupials that in South America occupied the ecological niches typical of other carnivorous mammal groups on other continents. Proborhyaena may be the largest carnivorous metatherians that ever lived.

Paleobiology
This animal must have been a fearsome marauder that certainly did not chase prey for long; it probably fed on large, slow-moving prey, such as Pyrotherium. Both Proborhyaena and numerous large ungulates became extinct during the Oligocene, and it is likely that this predator-prey ratio was influenced by climate change.

References 

Sparassodonts
Oligocene mammals of South America
Prehistoric mammal genera
Paleogene Argentina
Fossils of Argentina
Paleogene Bolivia
Fossils of Bolivia
Oligocene Uruguay
Fossils of Uruguay
Deseadan
Fossil taxa described in 1897
Taxa named by Florentino Ameghino
Golfo San Jorge Basin
Sarmiento Formation